Ömer Güleryüz (born 1997) is a Turkish amputee footballer playing as forward. He is a member of the Turkey national amputee football team.

Ömer Güleryüz was born in 1997 with congenital anomaly of a short left leg. He started playing football at age six. In his childhood, he used to play football by hoping as he had no crutches. At age of 13, he attracted attention while playing football on the street. He entered Yeditepe  Sports Club of amputee football in Istanbul, Turkey. In 2013, he was  called up for the first time to the Turkey national team preparation camp. He became a member of the Turkey national team in the forward position. He became top goalscorer netting 30 goals in the Turkish Amputee Football League in 2018. Internationally, he took part at the European Amputee Football Championship in 2017 in Turkey and 2021 in Poland. He played at the 2018 Amputee Football World Cup in Mexico. He performed a hat-trick in the group match against Italy, and again another one in the final game against Spain. Güleryüz was awarded the ttiles Top goalscorer and the Most valuable player pf the tournament.

Professionally playing for Etinesgut Sports Club in Ankara, Güleryuz sis a student of Physical Education and Sports at Istanbul University.

Honours 
International
 World Cup
 Winners (1):  2022
 Runners-up (1): 2018

 European Championship
 Winners (2): 2017, 20121

Individual
 Top goalscorer: 2021 European Championship (11 goals)
 Most valuable player:  2021 European Championship

References

1997 births
Living people
Footballers from Istanbul
Turkish amputee football players
Turkey international amputee football players
Association football forwards
Istanbul University alumni